Michelle Lane is a former Maryland public official whose findings in 2003 led to better protection of foster children under state care.  She is a registered nurse, business owner, and former university professor.

Maryland state government
Lane worked in Robert Ehrlich's congressional office, his 2002 gubernatorial campaign, and then his transition team before being appointed to his administration. She was placed at the Maryland Department of Human Resources (DHR) then moved to the Governor's Office of Children, Youth and Families (GOCYF) where she continued overseeing the Fostercare Consent Decree and other issues concerning the problematic Maryland Child Welfare System.

In 2003 she discovered, along with that agency's statistician, that the department assigned children to foster care social workers who no longer worked for the State of Maryland. This resulted in children not getting monthly visits from a social worker, clearly led to children's injuries, and probably contributed to preventable child deaths. Lane was fired in June 2004.

Governor Ehrlich, a Republican, said in 2005 that as a fired former employee, Lane was working with Democrats in a smear campaign against him. Lane's attorney and the Maryland Democratic Party director denied the allegations.

In 2006, Maryland Legislature auditors reported that they had found that caseworker staffing numbers had been improperly reported. The auditors also reported failures to investigate child abuse complaints. Legislators said that they would investigate 11 foster child deaths that occurred in 2004. At least hundreds of foster children's whereabouts were never accounted for. Lane was honored by the Nurses Association with a display on the Faces of Nursing Calendar for her work on behalf of children at DHR and GOCYF.

Lane was the Maryland state director for the Edwards presidential campaign in 2008.

Written work

Personal life
Lane has served in a professorship appointment at Towson University and has owned a home healthcare company since 1998.

References

American nurses
American whistleblowers
American women nurses
Living people
People from Harford County, Maryland
Year of birth missing (living people)
Towson University faculty
21st-century American businesswomen
21st-century American businesspeople
Businesspeople from Maryland